John Robins (born c. 1511) was an English politician.

Life
Little is known of Robins' personal life, and he is not thought to be originally from Dover. His date of death is unrecorded.

Career
He was a mariner. In 1559 and 1563, Robins was Member of Parliament for Dover, Kent. In 1562–63 and 1575–76 he was Mayor of Dover.

References

1511 births
Year of death missing
Members of the Parliament of England for Dover
Mayors of Dover
English MPs 1559
English MPs 1563–1567